The Col. Jacob Yoes Building is a historic commercial building on Front Street in Chester, Arkansas.  It is a two-story brick structure, with styling typical to its 1887 construction date.  It has segmented-arch windows, a band of corbelled brickwork at the cornice, below the flat sloping roof.  The building was designed to house a dry goods store in one storefront, and a hotel lobby in the other, with guest rooms on the second floor.  It is the only commercial building in the center of Chester to survive a pair of devastating fires in the early 20th century.

The building was listed on the National Register of Historic Places in 1975.

See also
National Register of Historic Places listings in Crawford County, Arkansas

References

Commercial buildings on the National Register of Historic Places in Arkansas
Buildings and structures completed in 1887
Buildings and structures in Crawford County, Arkansas
National Register of Historic Places in Crawford County, Arkansas